Zhang Jinghua (born July 1962) is a former Chinese politician who served as Chinese Communist Party Committee Secretary of Nanjing from 2017 to 2021. Zhang also has a seat on the Jiangsu provincial Standing Committee. On November 15, 2017, Zhang met with former Israeli Ambassador to China, Matan Vilnai. On August 30, 2017, Zhang led a party and government delegation to investigate the industrial development and technological innovation of Wuxi.  In December 2016, while serving as Vice-Governor of Jiangsu, Zhang visited the Nanjing University of Chinese Medicine.

Biography 
Zhang was born in Tai County (now Jiangyan District), Jiangsu, in July 1962. In 1981, he was accepted to Nanjing University, majoring in economic management. He joined the Chinese Communist Party in June 1985. He worked in the Central People's Government after university in 1985.

In October 1987, he was assigned to his home-province Jiangsu, where he successively served as director of Jiangsu Provincial Department of Environmental Protection, mayor of Xuzhou, party secretary of Zhenjiang, secretary-general of Jiangsu, and vice governor of Jiangsu. On 17 July 2017, he was appointed party secretary of Nanjing, capital of Jiangsu. On October 24, he was chosen as an alternate member of the 19th Central Committee of the Chinese Communist Party. On February 19, 2021, he was made deputy party secretary of Jiangsu, and held that office until November 19, when he took office as deputy party branch secretary of the Jiangsu Provincial Committee of the Chinese People's Political Consultative Conference.

Downfall 
On 1 December 2021, he has been placed under investigation for "serious violations of discipline and laws" by the Central Commission for Discipline Inspection (CCDI), the party's internal disciplinary body, and the National Supervisory Commission, the highest anti-corruption agency of China. He was the fifth vice ministerial-level official in Nanjing to be targeted by anti-corruption authorities since 2008, after Wang Wulong, Yang Weize, Ji Jianye, and Miao Ruilin.

References

1962 births
Living people
Nanjing University alumni
Chinese Communist Party politicians from Jiangsu
People's Republic of China politicians from Jiangsu
Political office-holders in Jiangsu
Politicians from Taizhou, Jiangsu